Francesco de Aiello (died 1453) was a Roman Catholic prelate who served as Archbishop of Bari-Canosa (1424–1453), Bishop of Todi (1407–1424), and Bishop of Cava de' Tirreni (1394–1407).

Biography
On 7 August 1394, Francesco de Aiello was appointed during the papacy of Pope Boniface IX as Bishop of Cava de' Tirreni.
On 30 December 1407, he was appointed during the papacy of Pope Gregory XII as Bishop of Todi.
In 1424, he was appointed during the papacy of Pope Martin V as Archbishop of Bari-Canosa.
He served as Archbishop of Bari-Canosa until his death in 1453.

References

External links and additional sources
 (for Chronology of Bishops) 
 (for Chronology of Bishops) 
 (for Chronology of Bishops) 
 (for Chronology of Bishops) 
 (for Chronology of Bishops) 
 (for Chronology of Bishops) 

15th-century Italian Roman Catholic bishops
Bishops appointed by Pope Boniface IX
Bishops appointed by Pope Gregory XII
Bishops appointed by Pope Martin V
1453 deaths